Betts House may refer to:

Betts House (Cincinnati, Ohio), the oldest brick house in Ohio
Betts House (Yale University), a mansion owned by Yale University in New Haven, Connecticut.